Jacob's Ladder is a ladder leading to heaven that was featured in a dream the biblical Patriarch Jacob had during his flight from his brother Esau in the Book of Genesis (chapter 28).

The significance of the dream has been debated, but most interpretations agree that it identified Jacob with the obligations and inheritance of the people chosen by God, as understood in Abrahamic religions.

Biblical narrative
The description of Jacob's Ladder appears in :

Judaism

The classic Torah commentaries offer several interpretations of Jacob's Ladder. According to the Midrash Genesis Rabbah, the ladder signified the exiles which the Jewish people would suffer before the coming of the Jewish messiah. First, the angel representing the 70-year exile of Babylonia climbed "up" 70 rungs, and then fell "down". Then the angel representing the exile of Persia went up a number of steps, and fell, as did the angel representing the exile of Greece. Only the fourth angel, which represented the final exile of Rome/Edom (whose guardian angel was Esau himself), kept climbing higher and higher into the clouds. Jacob feared that his children would never be free of Esau's domination, but God assured him that at the End of Days, Edom too would come falling down.

Another interpretation of the ladder keys into the fact that the angels first "ascended" and then "descended". The Midrash explains that Jacob, as a holy man, was always accompanied by angels. When he reached the border of the land of Canaan (the future Land of Israel), the angels who were assigned to the Holy Land returned to Heaven and the angels assigned to other lands came down to meet Jacob. When Jacob returned to Canaan, he was greeted by the angels who were assigned to the Holy Land.

Yet another interpretation is this: the place at which Jacob stopped for the night was in reality Mount Moriah, the future home of the Temple in Jerusalem, which was considered to be the "bridge" between Heaven and Earth. The ladder therefore signifies the "bridge" between Heaven and Earth.  Moreover, the ladder alludes to the giving of the Torah as another connection between heaven and earth. In this interpretation, it is also significant that the Hebrew word for ladder,  and the name for the mountain on which the Torah was given,  have the same gematria (numerical value of the letters).

The Hellenistic Jewish philosopher Philo, born in Alexandria, (d. ) presents his allegorical interpretation of the ladder in the first book of his De somniis. There he gives four interpretations, which are not mutually exclusive:

 The angels represent souls descending to and ascending from bodies (some consider this to be Philo's clearest reference to the doctrine of reincarnation).
 In the second interpretation, the ladder is the human soul and the angels are God's logoi, pulling the soul up in distress and descending in compassion.
 In the third view, the dream depicts the ups and downs of the life of the "practiser" (of virtue vs. sin).
 Finally, the angels represent the continually changing affairs of men.

The narrative of Jacob's Ladder was used, shortly after the destruction of the Second Temple in the Siege of Jerusalem (70 CE), as the basis for the pseudepigraphic Ladder of Jacob. This writing, preserved only in Old Church Slavonic, interprets the experience of Patriarchs in the context of Merkabah mysticism.

A hilltop overlooking the Israeli settlement of Beit El north of Jerusalem that is believed by some to be the site of Jacob's dream is a tourist destination during the holiday of Sukkot.

Christianity

Jesus said in John 1:51 "And he saith unto him, Verily, verily, I say unto you, Hereafter ye shall see heaven open, and the angels of God ascending and descending upon the Son of man."  This statement has been interpreted as associating or implicating Jesus with the mythical ladder, in that Christ bridges the gap between Heaven and Earth. Jesus presents himself as the reality to which the ladder points; as Jacob saw in a dream the reunion of Heaven and Earth, Jesus brought this reunion, metaphorically the ladder, into reality. Adam Clarke, an early 19th-century Methodist theologian and Bible scholar, elaborates:

The theme of a ladder to heaven is often used by the Church Fathers. Irenaeus in the second century describes the Christian Church as the "ladder of ascent to God".

In the third century, Origen explains that there are two ladders in the life of a Christian, the ascetic ladder that the soul climbs on the earth, by way of—and resulting in—an increase in virtue, and the soul's travel after death, climbing up the heavens towards the light of God.

In the fourth century, Gregory of Nazianzus speaks of ascending Jacob's Ladder by successive steps towards excellence, interpreting the ladder as an ascetic path, while Saint Gregory of Nyssa narrates that Moses climbed on Jacob's Ladder to reach the heavens where he entered the tabernacle not made with hands, thus giving the Ladder a clear mystical meaning. The ascetic interpretation is found also in Saint John Chrysostom, who writes:

Jacob's Ladder as an analogy for the spiritual ascetic of life enjoyed wide influence thanks to the classical work The Ladder of Divine Ascent by John Climacus.

Jacob's Ladder is depicted on the facade of Bath Abbey in England, with angels climbing up and down ladders on either side of the main window on the west front.

Islam 
In Islam, Jacob is revered as a prophet and patriarch. Muslim scholars drew a parallel between Jacob's vision of the ladder and Muhammad's event of the Mi'raj. The ladder of Jacob was interpreted to be one of the many symbols of God, and many see Jacob's Ladder as representing in its form the essence of Islam, which emphasizes following the "straight path". The twentieth-century scholar Martin Lings described the significance of the ladder in the Islamic mystic perspective:

See also
 As-Sirāt
 Crepuscular rays
 Jacob's Ladder (1990 film)
 Jacob's Ladder (Saint Helena)
 Jacob’s Ladder (toy)
 "Jack and the Beanstalk"
 , motet by Anton Bruckner
 "Nearer, My God, to Thee", hymn lyrics (written 1841) by Sarah Fuller Flower Adams
 Stairway to Heaven (disambiguation)
 The Ladder of Divine Ascent

References

External links

 Jacob's Ladder from a Jewish perspective at Chabad.org

Angelic apparitions in the Bible
Biblical dreams and visions
Hebrew Bible objects
Jacob
Ladders
Theophanies in the Hebrew Bible